Russia competed at the 2019 Summer Universiade in Naples, Italy from 2 to 14 July 2019. A total of 275 sportsmen competed in 17 sports.

Medalists

|width="25%" align=left valign=top|

Competitors

Archery

Recurve

Compound

Basketball

Summary

Men's tournament

Group stage

9–16th place quarterfinal

13–16th place semifinal

13th place game

Women's tournament

Group stage

Quarterfinal

5–8th place semifinal

Fifth place game

Diving

Men

Women

Mixed

Team classification

Qualification legend: QF – Qualify to final; SA – Qualify to Semifinal Group A; SB – Qualify to Semifinal Group B

Fencing

Men

Women

Football

Summary

Men's tournament

Group stage

Quarterfinal

Semifinal

Bronze medal match

Women's tournament

Group stage

Quarterfinal

Semifinal

Bronze medal match

Gymnastics

Artistic gymnastics
Men
Team

Individual finals

Women
Team

Individual finals

Rhythmic gymnastics
Individual

Group

Judo

Men

Women

Rugby sevens

Summary

Sailing

Shooting

Men

Women

Mixed team

Swimming

Men

Women

Table tennis

Singles

Doubles

Teams

Taekwondo

Kyorugi

Poomsae

Tennis

Team classification

Volleyball

Summary

Men's tournament

Group stage

Quarterfinal

Semifinal

Bronze medal match

Women's tournament
Group stage

Quarterfinal

Semifinal

Final

Water polo

Summary

Men's tournament

Group stage

Quarterfinal

Semifinal

Bronze medal match

Women's tournament

Group stage

Quarterfinal

Semifinal

Bronze medal match

References

Nations at the 2019 Summer Universiade
Summer Universiade
2019